Wade Forrester (born 23 March 1976) is an Australian former rugby league footballer.

Forrester played for the Cronulla-Sutherland Sharks for three seasons between 1997–1999, the St. George Illawarra Dragons in  2001 and the Northern Eagles in 2002.

Playing career
Forrester began his first grade career for Cronulla in 1997 during which the club had joined the rival super league competition. Forrester made 10 appearances but did not feature in the 1997 grand final. In 1999, Forrester made 6 appearances for Cronulla as the club won the minor premiership but did not play in the finals series. Forrester then went on to play 1 season for St George Illawarra in 2001 and then played a season with the now defunct Northern Eagles before retiring at the end of 2002.

References

Australian rugby league players
St. George Illawarra Dragons players
Cronulla-Sutherland Sharks players
Northern Eagles players
Living people
1976 births
Rugby league second-rows
Rugby league locks
Place of birth missing (living people)